Goldie Alexander (6 September 1936 – 3 August 2020) was an Australian author.

Biography
Goldie Alexander was born in Melbourne, 6 September 1936. Her parents were Polish migrants.

Style
A review of Hedgeburners described Alexander as "an experienced writer for primary-age children" and praised the "compelling plot, convincing characterization" and natural language used in the work.

A reviewer for the non-fiction book Talking about Your Weight noted that the work offered "good information and interesting insights" about the topic and they felt that it would not make readers self-conscious.  They noted that the focus was on "balance and solutions" and that information on eating disorders was not sensationalized.

Bibliography
	Astronet
	Beyond the Thicket
	Body and Soul: Lilbet's Romance
	Bridging the Snowy
	The Business of Writing for Young People (co-written with Hazel Edwards)
	Captain Gallant
	Car Crimes: the 2nd A~Z PI Mystery
	Cowpat$
	Dessi's Romance
	Dramatics: A Resource Book (co-written with Hazel Edwards)
	Gallipoli Medals
	The Grevillea Murder Mystery Trilogy
	A Hairy Story
	Health and Understanding 12 book Maga series (co-written with Hazel Edwards)
	Hedgeburners: An A~Z PI Mystery
	The History of Bread
	An Interview with Cindy Centipede
	Killer Virus and Other Stories
	Lame Duck Protest
	The Little Big School
	Mavis Road Medley
	Mentoring Your Memoir
	My Australian Story: Surviving Sydney Cove
	My Horrible Cousins and Other Stories
	Neptunia
	Right and Wrong: Class-Room Plays (co-written with Hazel Edwards)
	Seawall
	Shape Shifters
	6788
	Space Footy and Other Stories
	Starship Q
	Trapeze
	The Youngest Cameleer
	eSide: An adventure in Cyberspace
	That Stranger Next Door
	Cybertricks
	My Holocaust Story: Hanna
	Penelope's Ghost
	Emily's Ghost
	Shakespeare Now Trilogy
	The Trytth Chronicles
	Gap Year Nanny
	Changing History?

Awards
 Scholarship for the Romanian Writers Exchange Program September 2005
 Australian Society of Authors Mentor program 2005–2006, 2010 -2011, 2012-2013
 2000 & 2001 Mary Grant Bruce Award for two long short stories Mavis Road Medley. CBC Notable Book. Short Listed by the Office of Multicultural Affairs. 'Youth Literature 150 best Book
 Easternport Bay - Victorian Ministry of Arts Writing grant
 My Australian Story: Surviving Sydney Cove - CBC Notable Book
 Cassie's Big Swim - Brant Point Literary prize
 Body and Soul - Brant Point Literary prize
 Mavis Road Medley chosen by the State Library of Victoria and the Australian Centre for Youth Literature as one of 150 'treasures' to celebrate their 150th anniversary.
The Fellowship of Australian Writers Victoria Inc. National Literary Awards — FAW Mary Grant Bruce Award Short Story Award for Children's Literature with Roger Marchant - 2000.
The Fellowship of Australian Writers Victoria Inc. National Literary Awards — FAW Mary Grant Bruce Award Short Story Award for Children's Literature with Kerry Coombe - 1999.
 "Cybertricks", a 2016 Notable CBCA

References

Further reading

External links 
 

1936 births
2020 deaths
Australian children's writers
Australian non-fiction writers
Australian people of Polish descent
Australian women children's writers
Women mystery writers
Writers from Melbourne